In May 2013 the World Health Organization (WHO) reported that more than 270,000 pedestrians lose their lives on the world’s roads each year, accounting for 22% of the total 1.24 million road traffic deaths. Despite the magnitude of the problem, most attempts at reducing pedestrian deaths had historically focused solely on education and traffic regulation. Since the 1970s, crash engineers have begun to use design principles that have proved successful in protecting car occupants to develop vehicle design concepts that reduce the likelihood of injuries to pedestrians in the event of a car-pedestrian crash. These involve redesigning the bumper, hood (bonnet), and the windshield and pillar to be energy absorbing (softer) without compromising the structural integrity of the car. With the advent of ADAS (Automated Advanced Driver Assist Systems) since 2005, new pedestrian detection and crash avoidance and mitigation systems offer improvements through active rather than passive protection systems. For example, omniview technology allows a driver to see what is around the vehicle before moving.

Anatomy of a pedestrian crash

Many pedestrian crashes involve a forward moving car (as opposed to buses and other vehicles with a vertical hood/bonnet). In such a crash, a standing or walking pedestrian is struck and accelerated to the speed of the car and then continues forward as the car brakes to a halt. The pedestrian is impacted twice, first by the car and then by the ground, but most of the fatal injuries occur due to interaction with the car. Vehicle designers usually focus on understanding the car-pedestrian interaction, which is characterized by the following sequence of events: the vehicle bumper first contacts the lower limbs of the pedestrian, the leading edge of the hood hits the upper thigh or pelvis, and the head and upper torso are struck by the top surface of the hood and/or windshield.

Reducing pedestrian injuries
Most pedestrian deaths occur due to the traumatic brain injury resulting from the hard impact of the head against the stiff hood or windshield. In addition, although usually non-fatal, injuries to the lower limb (usually to the knee joint and long bones) are the most common cause of disabilities. A Frontal Protection System (FPS) then can be device fitted to the front end of a vehicle to protect both pedestrians and cyclists in the event of a front-end collision. Car design has been shown to have a large impact on the scope and severity of pedestrian injury in car crashes.

Volvo has created a pedestrian and cycle recognition ADAS with automatic braking designed to reduce pedestrian collisions. With pedestrian injuries and fatalities increasing dramatically in the US in 2017, perhaps because of increasingly distracted driving with entertainment and communication systems in cars, pedestrian safety driver support systems may become widespread.

Protecting the head
The hood of most vehicles is usually fabricated from sheet metal, which is a compliant energy absorbing structure which poses a comparatively small threat. Most serious head injuries occur when there is insufficient clearance between the hood and the stiff underlying engine components. A gap of approximately 10 cm is usually enough to allow the pedestrian’s head to have a controlled deceleration and a significantly reduced risk of death. Creating room under the hood is not always easy because usually there are other design constraints, such as aerodynamics and styling. In some regions of the hood it can be impossible. These include along the edges on which the hood is mounted and the cowl, where the hood meets the windshield. Engineers have attempted to overcome this problem by using deformable mounts, and by developing more ambitious solutions such as airbags that are activated during the crash and cover the stiff regions of the hood. Some models, like the Citroën C6 and Jaguar XK feature a novel pop-up bonnet design, which adds 6.5 cm (2.5", C6) extra clearance over the engine block if the bumper senses a hit. In 2012 and 2015, the Volvo V40 and the Land Rover Discovery Sport have an under-the hood airbag designed to operate if the hood senses a hit. The airbag is also designed to cover the windshield pillars to help protect the pedestrian's head.

Protecting the limbs
Most limb injuries occur due to a direct blow from the bumper and the leading edge of the hood. This leads to contact fractures of the femur and the tibia/fibula and damage to the knee ligaments due to bending of the joint. Thus, attempts at reducing these injuries involve reducing the peak contact forces by making the bumper softer and increasing the contact area and by limiting the amount of knee bending by modifying the geometry of the front end of the car. Computer simulations and experiments with cadavers show that when cars have lower bumpers, the thigh and leg rotate together causing the knee to bend less and thus reducing the likelihood of ligament injuries. Deeper bumper profiles and structures under the bumper (such as the air dam) can also assist in limiting the rotation of the leg.

Trams

An early example can be found on trams in the form of a lifeguard which prevents pedestrians from being caught between the wheels of the leading bogie should they be hit. When a pedestrian hit the lifeguard a scoop/grille would be automatically lowered in front of the vehicle. This protects the tram against derailment as well as reducing the likelihood of the pedestrian being killed. Lifeguards were compulsory on UK trams from early in the 1900s.

See also

 Car accidents
 Driver visibility
 Euro NCAP (pedestrian safety testing)
 Motorcycle Safety
 Road safety
 Tram accident
 Pedestrian automated safety systems

References
  
 
  
  
  
   SAE Paper No. 831623

Further reading
 Protecting pedestrians by vehicle design
 Used Car Safety Ratings - includes information on how seriously your vehicle is likely to harm other road users
 Assessment of Pedestrian Protection Afforded by Vehicles in Australia
 Pedestrian protection in vehicle impacts: Further results from the Australian New Car Assessment Program
 The Truth About Europe's Pedestrian Safety Legislation

External links
 Ciaran Simms talks about "Pedestrian crash safety: a triumph of design in bioengineering" at Ignite Dublin #1

Road transport
Vehicle safety technologies
Pedestrian safety